POWER UP (the "Professional Organization of Women in Entertainment Reaching Up") is an American non-profit organization and film production company with the stated mission "to promote the visibility and integration of gay women in entertainment, the arts, and all forms of media". It was founded in 2000 by  K. Pearson Brown, Stacy Codikow and Amy Shomer. Its members include women and men, gay and straight.

POWER UP provides funding and assistance to filmmakers, as well as producing its own films. After several short films, its first feature film was the comedy Itty Bitty Titty Committee directed by Jamie Babbit. In 2004, POWER UP was awarded the Leadership Award by the National Gay and Lesbian Task Force.

In 2001 K. Pearson Brown, one of the founding members, brought a sexual harassment suit against another founding member, Stacey Codikow. Codikow counter-sued alleging that Brown had made sexual overtures towards her and accusing Brown of defamation. Codikow also demanded Brown's resignation on the grounds that she was bisexual, and Brown later resigned. Both suits were dropped in late 2002.

Films
 2001: Stuck – Jamie Babbit
 2001: Chicken Night – Lisa Ginsburg
 2001: Breaking Up Really Sucks – Jennifer McGlone
 2003: Give or Take an Inch – Lee Friedlander
 2003: Fly Cherry – Jessica Sharzer
 2003: D.E.B.S. – Angela Robinson
 2003: Intent – Mary Ann Marino
 2004: Little Black Boot – Colette Burson
 2004: The Nearly Unadventurous Life of Zoe Cadwaulder – Buboo Kakati
 2004: Billy's Dad Is a Fudge-Packer – Jamie Donahue
 2005: Promtroversy – Leanna Creel
 2005: Starcrossed – James Burkhammer
 2007: Itty Bitty Titty Committee – Jamie Babbit
 2008: The Nitty Gritty Behind the Itty Bitty Titty Committee – Lisa Thrasher
 2014: Girltrash: All Night Long – Alexandra Kondracke

See also

List of LGBT-related organizations

References

External links
 Official site

Film production companies of the United States
Lesbian organizations in the United States
LGBT arts organizations
LGBT organizations in the United States
Non-profit organizations based in Los Angeles
Organizations established in 2000
Women's film organizations
501(c)(3) organizations